Sanima Bank started its operation in 2004 as a National Level Development Bank. Sanima was licensed to operate by the Nepal Rastra Bank to function as an "A" Class Commercial Bank in 2012.  Sanima has 102 full-fledged branches and 28 extension counters within and outside the Kathmandu Valley. The bank is also planning to expand its reach into various other parts of the country.

Capital Structure
Authorised Capital: Rs. 15,000,000,000
Issued Capital: Rs. 12,460,115,059
Paid-up Capital: Rs. 12,460,115,059

Shareholding Pattern 
Promoters	: 51%
General Public	: 49%

Logo

References

External links
Website of Century Bank Limited
List of Banks and Financial Institutions as per NRB
Company evaluation by ICRA Nepal

Banks of Nepal
2004 establishments in Nepal